Rivalry Week is a week of programming by ESPN devoted to showing the top rivalries in college basketball. Games that are annually shown during Rivalry Week include:

 Indiana vs. Purdue (Indiana–Purdue rivalry)
 Duke vs. North Carolina (Carolina–Duke rivalry)
 West Virginia vs. Pittsburgh (Backyard Brawl)
 Missouri vs. Kansas (Border War)
 Syracuse vs. Connecticut 
 Syracuse vs. Georgetown 
 Oklahoma vs. Oklahoma State (Bedlam Series)
 Villanova vs. Saint Joseph's (Holy War, also part of the Philadelphia Big 5)
 Kentucky vs. Florida 
 UMass vs. Temple
 Maryland vs. Duke (Duke–Maryland rivalry)
 Ohio State vs. Michigan 
 Auburn vs. Alabama (Iron Bowl of Basketball)
 Ole Miss vs. LSU 

ESPN original programming
ESPN College Basketball
College basketball rivalries in the United States